Come As You Are is a sex-positive sex shop located in Toronto, Ontario, Canada. It was founded in 1997 by Cory Silverberg as a worker-owner cooperative in the model of the United States-based Good Vibrations. Come As You Are has an educational and community-based mandate, aiming to provide a fully accessible store and a safe and comfortable environment where people can access sex information and products. The sex-shop is praised for their work making sex toys more accessible for people with disabilities.

The sex-shop website claims the co-op has "a fundamentally anti-capitalist and feminist approach to sexual pleasure, health, and education". Come As You Are has consistently been voted as one of Toronto's best sex shops by the readers of Now Toronto.

Education
Come As You Are frequently offers sex education, health, and pleasure workshops by sex-positive authors and educators including Midori, Ducky DooLittle, Kate Bornstein, Susie Bright and others.

The co-op also provides education outreach workshops to local community groups and universities.  In 2013, Come As You Are won The Co-operators' National Co-op Challenge with a proposal to bring their educational outreach to communities across Canada.

References

External links
Official Website
Sexy Contours Site
Sex Dolls & Love Dolls

Sex shops
Sexuality in Canada
BDSM organizations
Retail companies established in 1997
Online retailers of Canada
Shops in Toronto
Cooperatives in Canada